Surkhet District is a district in Karnali Province of mid-western Nepal. It had 288,527 population in 2001 and 350,804 in 2011 which male comprised 169,461 and female 181,381. Its district headquarters, Birendranagar, is the capital of Karnali Province. It is serving as a business hub and document center for Karnali province. According to population, development, road links, landforms, climate, many peoples are migrating here. after becoming province capital developmental activities are boosted and are in peak level. all the governmental works are carried here. Birendranagar is beautiful valley surrounded by hills having moderate climate.

Geography and Climate
Surkhet Valley is one of the Inner Terai Valleys of Nepal. It borders, Achham district of Sudurpashchim, Dailekh and Jajarkot districts to the north, Salyan district to the east,  Banke and Bardiya districts of Lumbini and Kailali of Sudurpaschim to the south, and Doti district of Sudurpaschim to the west.

Unlike the cold weather of the Karnali mountain region and hot weather of the Outer Terai region, Surkhet has a more moderate climate. Winter temperatures drop to about 5 °C and in summer it goes up to 38 °C. Monsoon brings sufficient rainfall during the rainy season. Surkhet ranks low in overall change in climatic condition. 42% covers with plain fertile land and 43% of Mahabharat Range. Rest in Siwalik range rich in forest resource.

Education
Adult literacy of 73.1%.

Some government educational institutions
 Mid-West University (MU)
 Surkhet Multiple Campus (TU)
 Shree Krishna Sanskrit Tatha Sadharan secondary school
 Amar Jyoti  model secondary School, Neware
 Shiva secondary school, Latikoili
 Bhairab Secondary School Awalching, 
 Malika Secondary School Matela 
 Janta Secondary School Ranibas 
 Sarswati Secondary School Pamka 
 Indreni Secondary School Gogne 
 Ne Ra Secondary School Kadaghuwani 
 Ne ra Secondary School Dhaulachakhachaur
 Jana model secondary School, Birendranagar
 Tripureshwor Secondary School Dhodekhali

Some Notable private institutions
 Valley Meridian Academy HS School
 Surkhet Horizon Academy
 Sahara Campus
 Model College (TU), Khajura
 Siddhapaila Campus
 Kopila Valley School
 Jana Priya Secondary School
 Bulbule Bheri Academy
 Eager Bridge secondary School
 Usha Balvatika HS School
 Mount Everest HS School
 SOS Hermann Gmeiner Higher secondary School
Harvestmoon Secondary Boarding School
 Nav Jyoti School
 Children Paradise boarding school

Demographics
At the time of the 2011 Nepal census, Surkhet District had a population of 350,804. Of these,
89.7% spoke Nepali, 7.1% Magar, 1.7% Tharu, 0.3% Gurung, 0.3% Raji, 0.2% Hindi, 0.2% Newar, 0.1% Belhare, 0.1% Bhojpuri, 0.1% Maithili, 0.1% Urdu and 0.1% other languages as their first language. 

In terms of ethnicity/caste, 31.4% were Chhetri, 19.1% Magar, 18.5% Kami, 11.5% Hill Brahmin, 4.6% Damai/Dholi, 4.6% Thakuri, 2.4% Sarki, 1.8% Tharu, 1.7% Sanyasi/Dasnami, 1.3% Gurung, 0.5% Badi, 0.5% Musalman, 0.5% Newar, 0.3% Raji, 0.2% Gaine, 0.1% Bhote, 0.1% Chhantyal, 0.1% Kumal, 0.1% Majhi, 0.1% Tamang, 0.1% other Terai and 0.2% others.

In terms of religion, 91.9% were Hindu, 4.1% Buddhist, 3.4% Christian, 0.5% Muslim and 0.1% others.

In terms of literacy, 72.5% could read and write, 2.8% could only read and 24.7% could neither read nor write.

History
Before its own identity as an independent district, it used to be in the district of Dailekh. Surkhet is hub to remoter districts like Kalikot, Jumla, Mugu, Jajarkot, and Salyan. Recently because of the Maoist insurgency which ended in 2008, many people have migrated to Surkhet from these districts. for various purposes population are attracted towards this valley.

Infrastructure
Surkhet is accessible by air service and roads from various parts of the country. districts not having road links uses airservices for travelling.Ratna highway links it to the rest of Nepal. Karnali Highway, recently constructed and being black topped, it will link Surkhet to the remote Western Karnali region. Surkhet Airport in Birendranagar has regular and scheduled flights to Kathmandu, Nepalgunj, Jumla and other districts. The Karnali districts are connected through regular domestic flights. Thousands of hotels, inns and lodges are available during a stay at Birendranagar, the capital of Karnali Province.

Mid-western University started 2010 in Birendranagar and offers 18 variable master's degree courses as well as 24 bachelor courses. It is one of the newest educational institute upgrading in recent years. Three colleges offer education up to Master's level. There are many 10+2 schools teaching science, management, humanities, rural development, education etc. Other institutions offer technical education such as veterinary, overseer, computer assistant, assistant health worker and ANM.

There is a regional hospital in Kalagaun. Nepal Red Cross Society, Surkhet Eye Hospital is main eye care service provider which is located at Budhapath in Birendranagar Municipality in Surkhet. There are many NGOs and INGOs working in this area for development. The INF Surkhet Programme is one of the oldest organizations working in the health and development sector. There are other INGOs like GTZ, DFID, DANIDA, USAID, Oxfam, and the BlinkNow Foundation.

Tourism
Tourist attractions are places like Kakrebihar temple, Bulbule Lake, Deutibajai temple, Mangalgadhi, Gothikanda, Ghantaghar, Bheri river and others with religious as well as historic value. Kakrebihar is the remains of an old Buddhist Monastery (palace), which is in the list of national heritage sites in Nepal. Bheri river is a common destination for rafting and paragliding has been recently started in Surkhet. Birendranagar is one of Nepal's few cities built under a master plan. It is popularly known as "Gateway to karnali". Rara (biggest lake of Nepal), Shey phoksundo lake, five religious sites inside Dailekh, Kubinde lake ( Salyan) and several terrains can be taken into account through roadway Ratna Highway (named after Queen Ratna Rajya laxmi devi Shah) and Jumla Highway. Surkhet is open to Tourist connecting way to Kailash Mansarowar Tibet through Flights and helicopter charter from Nepalgunj or roadway Surkhet. Shortest fasttrack of Nepal that connects Chinese and Indian border is under construction. Unlikely, tourists can find the hottest place Nepalgunj to colder area in Nepal.

Kakrebihar

Kankrebihar is a stone temple on the top of the hillock built in the 12th century. This temple is located in southeast of the Surkhet valley. It is about 6 km far from Birendranagar. It is one of the most famous historical and religious place of Karnali province. The temple is constructed in sikhar style. The temple is surrounded by forest. From Mangalgadi you have to take south for about 3 and a half kilometer up to Shiva mandir on Latakoili Danda top and turn left towards east about 2 to 2.5 Km.

Thousands of tourists came here for religious purpose and to experience the atmosphere and views of nature. This place continuously ranks as one of the most important tourist destinations in surgery. The carved stones and bronze statues reflect the images of Buddha, and many Hindu gods and goddesses including Saraswati and Ganesh. There are statues of different gods and goddesses made up of stones. It is believed that pandas used to came there and play. It is also said that they made a cave there. The bihar is likely to have been Collapsed due to strom. The plan of government of re-erecting the temple into its original structure had been completed by the end of 2075 BS. There is ticket system to enter at the gate of the temple. It is far away from the city. So, facility of hotels and other staying are not available there. We cannot found any human settlement near the temple as it is surrounded by forest. Nearby it there is a picnic spot.

Kankre Bihar was built during the regime of King Ashok Challa of Sinja Kingdom (now jumla) approximately in 1268 AD, who has ruled between 1255 and 1278 AD, he was the son of Kra challa whose son king Jitari challa adopted the "Malla" since then the "challa" Dynasty was known as Malla in the history of Nepal. King Ashok was the follower of the Mahayana Buddhism and the Kankrebihar is symbol of devotion to Buddha. His kingdom Extended up to Trisuli River in the East, Sutlej River-Garwal-Laddhakh in the West, khari region of Tibet in the North and the Terai in the South.

Division

On 10 March 2017 Government of Nepal restricted old administrative structures and announced 744 new local level units as per the new constitution of Nepal 2015, thus cancelled all Village development committees and introduce Gaupalika (Rural municipality) and some new urban municipalities with the old urban municipalities (made some changes in area of old municipalities).

According to new structure Surkhet district divided into five municipality (urban) and four rural municipalities:

References

 
Districts of Nepal established in 1962
Districts of Karnali Province